Kathleen Hanratty was a camogie player with Louth and the inspiration behind two appearances in the All Ireland camogie finals of 1934 and 1936.

Life
Hanratty was nicknamed the Lory Meagher of camogie, despite Louth's poor reputation in camogie.

References

External links
 Camogie.ie Official Camogie Association Website

Louth camogie players
Year of birth missing
Possibly living people